L Schuler AG v Wickman Machine Tool Sales Ltd  is an English contract law case, concerning the right to terminate performance of a contract.

Facts
Wickman alleged that  wrongfully terminated their contract for Wickman to visit car makers to market Schuler's panel presses, as their sole representative for four-and-a-half years, even though Wickman had failed to make visits. Clause 7(b) said, ‘It shall be a condition of this agreement that [Wickman] shall send its representatives to visit [the six largest UK car manufacturers of the time] at least once in every week for the purpose of soliciting orders for panel presses.’ Clause 11 said either party could end the agreement if the other was in material breach and did not change its behaviour on 60 days' notice. Mr Wickman failed to make any visits at the start. This was waived by Schuler at first, but then when Wickman was making some but not all the visits, Schuler terminated. Wickman sued, alleging Schuler was not allowed to terminate.

Judgment
The House of Lords held by a majority that Schuler was not entitled to terminate, and held clause 7(b) to be not a condition. Clause 7 was to be read with clause 11, so that notice would need to be given to remedy the situation, and if notice and 60 days to change was not given, then clause 7 would not be breached. Only after 60 days without compliance would ‘rescission’ (i.e. termination) be allowed. Lord Reid said the following.

Lord Morris, Lord Simon and Lord Kilbrandon concurred.

Lord Wilberforce dissented, holding that Schuler should have been able to terminate.

See also

English contract law

Notes

References
 
 

English contract case law
House of Lords cases
1973 in case law
1973 in British law
Lord Wilberforce cases